Matthew Hackett is an American computer graphics animator. In 2008, Hackett was nominated for a Visual Effects Society Award in the category of Outstanding Animated Character in a Live Action Broadcast Program or Commercial (shared with Jeff Willette, Sean Andrew Faden, and actor Denis Gauthier. Hackett is featured within the 2001 documentary short The Making of Final Fantasy: The Spirits Within.

His numerous film credits for visual effects and computer animation includes:
Let Me In (2010)
I'm Here (2010)
National Treasure: Book of Secrets (2007)
Apocalypto (2006)
Deja Vu (2006)
The Amityville Horror (2005)
Sky High (2005)
National Treasure (2004)
I, Robot (2004)
Final Flight of the Osiris (2003)
Master and Commander: The Far Side of the World (2003)
Charlie's Angels: Full Throttle (2003)
Final Fantasy: The Spirits Within (2001)
Godzilla (1998)

References

External links 
 

Year of birth missing (living people)
Living people
Computer animation people
American animators
Place of birth missing (living people)